Ledger is an unincorporated community in Pondera County, Montana, United States. The community had a post office until December 17, 2005; it still has its own ZIP code, 59456.

The post office opened in 1916 under the name Esper. The name changed in 1917 to Ledgerwood in honor of local resident Dan Ledgerwood. Since North Dakota already had a Ledgerwood, some residents shortened the name to Ledger.

References

Unincorporated communities in Pondera County, Montana
Unincorporated communities in Montana